The large rufous horseshoe bat (Rhinolophus rufus) is a species of bat in the family Rhinolophidae. It is endemic to the Philippines.

References

Rhinolophidae
Mammals of the Philippines
Mammals described in 1836
Endemic fauna of the Philippines
Taxonomy articles created by Polbot
Bats of Southeast Asia
Taxa named by Paul Gervais